The 1968 United States Senate election in  Oregon was held on November 5, 1968. Incumbent Democratic U.S. Senator Wayne Morse was seeking a fifth term, but narrowly lost re-election to 36 year-old Republican State Representative Bob Packwood in a very close race.

Democratic primary
The general primary was held May 28, 1968. Incumbent Senator Wayne Morse defeated former Representative Robert B. Duncan. Duncan, an outspoken supporter of the Vietnam War, had previously been the Democratic nominee in the 1966 United States Senate election in Oregon, and the anti-war Morse had endorsed Duncan's opponent Mark Hatfield, an anti-war Republican.

Candidates
Wayne Morse, incumbent U.S. Senator since 1945.
Robert B. Duncan, former U.S. Congressman from Oregon's 4th congressional district (1963–1967).
Phil McAlmond, millionaire and former aide to opponent Robert B. Duncan.

Results

General election

Candidates
Bob Packwood (R), State Rep.
Wayne Morse (D), incumbent U.S. Senator

Results

See also 
 1968 United States Senate elections

References

Oregon
1968
Senate